Iota Eridani (ι Eri) is a solitary star in the constellation Eridanus. It is visible to the naked eye with an apparent magnitude of 4.11. With an annual parallax shift of 0.02165 arcseconds, it lies at an estimated distance of about 151 light years.

This is an evolved red clump giant star with a stellar classification of K0 III. At an estimated distance of the star, this yields a physical size of around 11 times the radius of the Sun. It has 1.42 times the mass of the Sun and radiates 57.5 times the solar luminosity from its outer atmosphere at an effective temperature of 4,683 K. It is around four billion years old.

References

K-type giants
Horizontal-branch stars
Eridanus (constellation)
Eridani, Iota
016815
012486
0794
Durchmusterung objects